General convention of Rastriya Prajatantra Party also the unity convention of the party is scheduled for 1-3 December 2021 to elect central committee members and portfolios.  A total 4,500 delegates were took part in the convention with nine from each provincial constituency. It was held in Bhrikuti Mandap, Kathmandu of Nepal. Similarly, some special guest like Prime Minister Sher Bahadur Deuba from Nepali Congress, former prime minister Madhav Kumar Nepal from CPN (US) including other representative from parties within and outside Nepal who were present in the opening ceremony of the program.

Participation
A total 4,500 delegates were elected who would vote in the convention. Among them, there is a provision of 2,970 elected delegates from 330 provincial assembly constituency while. Others shall come from sister organizations and some shall be nominated by president. The party elected nine representatives from each Province Assembly constituency based on inclusiveness according to which, three from Khas Arya, three from women, one from Janajati, one from Dalit, one from minority, Muslim, Tharu.

In short, 50,000 active members of the party throughout the country took part in these process.

Elected portfolios 
On 1 November 2021, it was announced that election shall take place by the help of EVM.

Reference

Internal elections of political parties in Nepal
2021 in Nepal